Samuel Waermö (born 1968) is a successful international Swedish songwriter and music producer with a big number of accomplishments and hits and a number of chart-topping #1 hits (33 #1 at the charts) mostly in Europe and East Asia.
Since 2008 he runs his own publishing company called SWEMUSIC ( webadress: swemusic.com)

He is co-written songs with Michael Garvin, Randy Goodrum, Desmond Child, Andreas Carlsson, Jörgen Elofsson and Pelle Nylen Samuel Waermö was also involved in the production of 6 songs on the Bon Jovi hugely successful album Bounce.

Songs
Wang Leehom – "My Heart Holds the Love" (Taiwan)
Scandal'us – "High on your Love" (Australia - Platinum)
John Farnham – "When I Can't Have You" (Australia - 3× platinum)
Whatfor – "Un peu de patience" (France Popstars)
Alexander Klaws – "Break Free" (Germany - 2× platinum)
Daniel Lindström – "Break Free" (Sweden - Platinum)
BoA – "Quincy" (Japan - Japan Record Award nomination)
BoA – "Love Can Make a Miracle" (South Korea)
Rosa López – "La Esencia de Tu Voz" (Spain - 2× platinum)
Bon Jovi – Bounce (album) (4.5m copies sold)
K One – "Power Generation" (Taiwan)
Elena Paparizou – "Mambo" (Greece - platinum)
Mink – "Glory of Life" (Japan - #1 USA Billboard Dance Chart)
Tobias Regner – "She's So" (German Idol winner)
Clay Aiken – "Lonely No More" (USA - gold)
NEWS – "My Only World" (Japan)
Kanjani Eight – Glorious (album) (Japan)
Arashi – "To Be Free" (Japan - 2× platinum)
Kis-my-ft2 – "Everybody Go" (Japan - platinum)
SixTONES - "My Hometown" (Japan 2× platinum)

Awards
Samuel was for awarded for best pop song in Taiwan for the song "My Heart Hold the Love" performed by Leehom Wang

In 1998, he won a Grammy in Japan for best pop song . He also got another Grammy in 2004 for the song "Quincy", with the artist BoA in Japan, with the single selling over 1.3 million copies.

References

Swedish songwriters
Swedish record producers
1968 births
Living people